Tolimán is a stratovolcano in Guatemala, on the southern shores of Lake Atitlán. The volcano has an elevation of 3,158 m (10,361 ft) and was formed near the southern margin of the Pleistocene Atitlán III caldera. The top of the volcano has a shallow crater and its flanks are covered with the thick remains of ancient lava flows that emerged from vents in the volcano's flanks.

Cerro de Oro 
A parasitic lava dome, known as Cerro de Oro, was formed on the volcano's northern flank, which may have erupted a few thousand years ago.

Gallery

See also
 List of volcanoes in Guatemala

References 
 

Mountains of Guatemala
Stratovolcanoes of Guatemala
Volcano